Giants Gaming, commonly referred to simply as Giants, is a Spanish professional esports organisation that has teams competing in Counter-Strike: Global Offensive, League of Legends, Call of Duty, FIFA, Fortnite, and Rainbow Six Siege. The League of Legends (LoL) team competes in the European League of Legends Championship Series. The organisation has two Rainbow Six Siege teams, a Singaporean team competing Southeast Asian Pro League and a Spanish team competing in the Spanish Nationals. Giants Gaming was founded in 2008 in Málaga, Spain.

Counter-Strike: Global Offensive

Tournament results 

2017

 13th-16th - CEVO Main Season 12 Europe
 2nd - ESL Masters Spain Spring 2017 Finals
 2nd - 4Gamers CS:GO Masters Porto
 5th-6th - ESL Clash of Nations
 3rd-4th - ESL Masters Spain Winter 2017 Finals
 3rd-4th - Superliga Orange Season 13 Finals

2018

 1st - Master League Portugal
 3rd-4th - Moche XL eSports CS:GO Cup
 1st - Superliga Orange Finals 2018
 3rd-4th - ESL Masters Spain Spring 2018 Finals
 7th-8th - DreamHack Open Valencia 2018
 9th-16th - ESEA Advanced Season 28 Europe
 1st - IeSF EWC Portugal 2018
1st - Worten Game Ring Master League Portugal
1st - ESL Masters Spain Winter 2018 Finals

2019

 9th-12th - LOOT.BET HotShot Series Season 1
 1st - BLAST Pro Series Madrid 2019 Play-in
 1st - BLAST Pro Series Madrid 2019 Play-in Finals
6th - BLAST Pro Series Madrid 2019

League of Legends

Tournament results 
2013

 7th — 2013 Spring EU LCS

2016

 3rd — 2016 Summer EU LCS
 5th/6th — 2016 Summer EU LCS Playoffs

Tom Clancy's Rainbow Six Siege 
Giants Gaming first acquired a Rainbow Six Siege team on 8 June 2018. The Spanish team would remain one of the top teams in Spain until it disbanded in October of the following year.

On 8 August 2019, Giants Gaming picked up top European team, Looking For Org shortly before the Six Major Raleigh. The original roster consisted of Maurice "AceeZ" Erkelenz, Léo "Alphama" Robine, Théophile "Hicks" Dupont, Lukas "Korey" Zwingmann, Valentin "Risze" Liradelfo, and Laurent "Crapelle" Patriarche as coach along with Robin "Robz" Planus as the team's manager. Giants placed 5-8th after defeating Evil Geniuses and Ninjas in Pyjamas but falling to ForZe Esports in the quarter finals. After unsatisfactory results at the Pro League Season 10 Finals, Alphama was kicked and later joined American team, . The roster, along with the addition of AceeZ and Korey's former teammate, Jan "Ripz" Hucke, was later bought by Rogue, who previously fielded an American team.

On 9 January 2020, Giants Gaming picked up their third team, the Singaporean squad Aerowolf. Before the acquisition, Aerowolf decisively defeated the best teams in Australia and Japan in the Season 10 APAC Finals, Fnatic and Nora-Rengo respectively, before beating the previous Giants roster and challenging eventual runner-ups, American DarkZero Esports, at the Season 10 Finals. At the Six Invitational 2020, Giants lost to MiBR and Team Liquid in the group stage.

Rosters

Valorant

Notable Achievements

Tom Clancy's Rainbow Six Siege

Spanish Team

References

External links 
 Official website 
 Official website 
 @GiantsGaming on Twitter
 @GiantsGamingENG on Twitter

Former European League of Legends Championship Series teams
Call of Duty teams
2008 establishments in Spain
FIFA (video game series) teams
Esports teams based in Spain
Tom Clancy's Rainbow Six Siege teams